ʿĀtikah bint Murrah ibn Hilāl ibn Fālij ibn Dhakwān (fl. 5th century CE) was a Hawazin heiress, and the mother of Hashim ibn 'Abd Manaf, thus the great-great-grandmother of Islamic prophet Muhammad.

Family 
She was daughter of Murrah ibn Hilal and Safiya bint Awf, cousin of Murrah. Atikah was a woman from Banu Hawazin. She married a leader of Banu Ka'b ibn Lu'ayy, Abd Manaf ibn Qusay. By him, she had many sons. The sons are: al-Muttalib (المطلب), Amr/Hashim (عمرو/هاشم) dan Abd Shams (عبد الشمس). The daughters are: Barrah (برة), Halah (هالة), Tumāḍir (تماضر), Qilabah (قلابة), Hayyah (حياة), Rayta (ريطة), Kathamah (خثامة) and Sufyanah (سفيانة).

Biography
Atikah was wife of Abd Manaf ibn Qusai. The birth of her conjoined twin sons 'Amr (more commonly known as Hashim) and 'Abd Shams was remembered for 'Amr being born with one of his toes pressed into 'Abd Shams's forehead. It was said that they had struggled in the womb seeking to be firstborn. Legend says that their father Abd Manaf ibn Qusai separated the conjoined brothers with a sword and that some priests believed that the blood that had flown between them signified wars between their progeny (confrontations did occur between Banu al'Abbas and Banu Ummaya ibn 'Abd Shams in the year 750 AH).

Atikah also bore Abd Manaf ibn Qusai three other sons; Muttalib, and six daughters; Barrah, Halah, Tumadir/Tamadur, Qilaba, Hayya, Raytah/Rita, Khathamah, Sufyanah

Notable descendants

See also
Family tree of Muhammad

References

Year of death unknown
Year of birth unknown
5th-century women
5th-century Arabs
Family of Muhammad
Sahabah ancestors
Hawazin